The United States ambassador to São Tomé and Príncipe is the official representative of the government of the United States to the government of São Tomé and Príncipe. Until 2022, the ambassador was concurrently the ambassador to Gabon, while resident in Libreville. Beginning in 2022, representation for São Tomé and Príncipe was moved to Luanda, with the ambassador concurrently the ambassador to Angola, due to the countries' "longstanding cultural, linguistic, and economic ties."

Ambassadors

See also
São Tomé and Príncipe – United States relations
Foreign relations of São Tomé and Príncipe
Ambassadors of the United States

References

United States Department of State: Background notes on São Tomé and Príncipe

External links
 United States Department of State: Chiefs of Mission for São Tomé and Príncipe
 United States Department of State: São Tomé and Príncipe
 United States Embassy in Libreville

 
Sao Tome and Principe
Lists of ambassadors to São Tomé and Príncipe